Sailing (as Yachting) was contested at the 1970 Asian Games in Pattaya Bay, Pattaya, Thailand in December 1970. There were five events in the competition.

Medalists

Medal table

References 
 Asian Games medalists
 Results

External links 
 Olympic Council of Asia

 
1970 Asian Games events
1970
Asian Games
Sailing competitions in Thailand